The Winner is a 2011 American-Polish co-production written and directed by Wieslaw Saniewski and starring Pawel Szajda, Janusz Gajos, Wojciech Pszoniak and Marta Żmuda-Trzebiatowska.

Film tells a story of Oliver (played by Pawel Szajda, "Under the Tuscan Sun" and HBO's "Generation Kill") who is a young and talented pianist. When his life and promising career suddenly collapse, he finds an unexpected help in a retired math teacher, now a compulsive horse race gambler (played by Janusz Gajos).

The Winner was filmed in Chicago, German town Baden-Baden and Polish city of Wroclaw and Lądek Zdrój. Film's soundtrack includes music of Chopin, three Elvis Presley's songs and tango.

External links 
 

2011 films
Polish-language films
Polish drama films
2010s Polish-language films
American drama films
2010s American films